NCAA Season 98 is the 2022–23 athletic year of the National Collegiate Athletic Association in the Philippines. It is hosted by Emilio Aguinaldo College and was opened on September 10, 2022.

Background 
At the closing proceedings of NCAA Season 97, the then-Season Policy Board President from De La Salle–College of Saint Benilde turned over the NCAA Flag to the next host. Season 98 opened at the Smart Araneta Coliseum on September 10, with the rest of the elimination round once again returning at Filoil EcoOil Centre.

After two seasons, events such as men's and women's volleyball, track and field, swimming, and beach volleyball events will return at the senior's division. For juniors, the competition will be composed of online taekwondo, online chess, and boys' basketball.

Basketball 

The seniors' basketball tournament is scheduled to begin on September 10. A juniors' tournament, the first since 2019, is expected to be held.

Seniors' tournament

Elimination round

Playoffs

Awards

Juniors' tournament

Elimination round

Playoffs

Awards

Volleyball

Men's tournament

Elimination round

Playoffs

Women's tournament

Elimination round

Playoffs

Beach volleyball 
The NCAA Beach Volleyball tournaments were held in the Subic Bay Sand Courts in Olongapo.

Men's tournament

Elimination round

Bracket

Semifinals 
Both Perpetual and EAC have the twice-to-beat advantage while they only have to win once, while their opponents twice, to advance to the Finals.

Perpetual vs. San Beda 

Perpetual wins series in one game

EAC vs. Arellano 

EAC wins series in one game

Finals 
This is a single elimination game.

Awards 
 Most Valuable Player:

Women's tournament

Elimination round

Bracket

Semifinals 
Both Perpetual and EAC have the twice-to-beat advantage while they only have to win once, while their opponents twice, to advance to the Finals.

Perpetual vs. San Beda 

Perpetual wins series in one game

EAC vs. CSJL

Letran wins series in one game

Finals 
This is a single elimination game.

Awards 
 Most Valuable Player:

See also 
 UAAP Season 85

References 

2022 in multi-sport events
2023 in multi-sport events
2022 in Philippine sport
2023 in Philippine sport
National Collegiate Athletic Association (Philippines) seasons